Wroxall railway station was an intermediate station on the Isle of Wight Railway line from Ryde, situated between Shanklin and Ventnor with an upland situation. To the north lay Apse Bank with its three miles of 1 in 70 gradient and three bridges. The gradient eased in the station but increased again to 1 in 88 as Ventnor Tunnel was approached.

History
Reasonably busy with commuter traffic all the year round it was originally built with  a single siding, goods traffic diminished rapidly with the advent of the motor bus. The Station Hotel was situated on the Up Platform and was converted into housing after the station closed.  Next to this was a single storey station, now demolished.  On the down side was a small shelter. The station was lit by gas up until its closure. Apse bank was a favourite location for photographers as it presented by far the hardest challenge to steam trains on the Ryde-Ventnor route.

The station has been demolished with a new road (Station Road) running across the south end of the site. The adjacent Station Hotel still stands having been converted into residential units, located on St. Martins Road, as does the road overbridge.

Stationmasters

Charles Panty ca. 1868 - 1871 (afterwards station master at Shanklin)
Charles Newnham ca. 1876
William Weeks 1877 - 1882 (afterwards station master at St Helen's)
Philip Jenkin 1882 - 1912 (afterwards station master at Ventnor)
Alex Wheway until 1919
W. Lown from 1937 (also station master at Shanklin)

References

See also
 List of closed railway stations in Britain

Disused railway stations on the Isle of Wight
Former Isle of Wight Railway stations
Railway stations in Great Britain opened in 1866
Railway stations in Great Britain closed in 1966
Beeching closures in England
1866 establishments in England